The following are characters who first appeared in the BBC soap opera EastEnders during 2013, listed by order of first appearance. New characters were introduced by Lorraine Newman, executive producer until December 2013, when Dominic Treadwell-Collins took over.

The first character to be announced was Dexter Hartman (Khali Best), the teenage son of Ava Hartman (Clare Perkins). He was introduced in January. Steve Lowe (Michael Simkins), Bianca Butcher's (Patsy Palmer) probation officer and a love interest for Carol Jackson (Lindsey Coulson), arrived as a recurring character in February, and in March, Kane and his gang appeared for a storyline involving Liam Butcher (James Forde). Dexter's father Sam James (Cornell S John) arrived in May. Kirsty Branning's (Kierston Wareing) ex-boyfriend Carl White (Daniel Coonan) joined the show in June. Two short-term characters, Betty Spragg (Tessa Wyatt), and Ollie Walters (Tony O'Callaghan), arrived in July. Sadie Young (Kate Magowan) arrived on the show in August, as the new owner of the beauty salon. Former Hollyoaks actor Jamie Lomas made his first appearance in August as well, playing Jake Stone. Upon the announcement that established character David Wicks (Michael French) was returning to the show, Lisa Maxwell was cast as his girlfriend, Naomi, who appeared in September for one episode. Terry Alderton, playing Terry Spraggan, made his debut in November, along with his children TJ (George Sargeant) and Rosie (Jerzey Swingler). Former Holby City actress Luisa Bradshaw-White was cast as Shirley Carter's (Linda Henry) younger sister Tina, who first appeared in November, followed in December by Shirley's brother, who later transpired to be her son, Mick Carter (Danny Dyer), Mick's partner, Linda (Kellie Bright), and their youngest son, Johnny (Sam Strike).

Dexter Hartman

Dexter Hartman, played by Khali Best, is the son of Ava Hartman (Clare Perkins) and grandson of Cora Cross (Ann Mitchell). He made his first appearance on 7 January 2013. The casting and character was announced on 8 November 2012. Best was offered the role after he was paired up with Perkins at a workshop held by the producers of EastEnders. Executive producer, Lorraine Newman described Dexter as a "force of nature." Dexter comes to Walford and gets a job as a mechanic at The Arches, and befriends Jay Brown (Jamie Borthwick) and Lola Pearce (Danielle Harold). His significant storylines include his struggle to accept his estranged father, Sam James (Cornell S John) and his losing Phil Mitchell's (Steve McFadden) £10,000. More recently, Dexter has been taking an interest in Nancy Carter (Maddy Hill).

Steve Lowe

Steve Lowe, played by Michael Simkins, first appears in episode 4585, first broadcast on 11 February. He is introduced as Bianca Butcher's (Patsy Palmer) probation officer. He makes his last appearance in episode 4622, first broadcast on 15 April.

Steve first appears when he visits Bianca at her home. He later meets Bianca in the café and takes a liking to her mother Carol Jackson (Lindsey Coulson). He arranges to meet Carol, and stops being Bianca's probation officer. He tells Carol that when he heard that her son Billie Jackson (Devon Anderson) had died, he felt they had a connection, as his daughter Emily died in 1998, two days before her 10th birthday. They meet again the next day. A few weeks later, Bianca sees Steve on heading for her house, and thinks it has something to do with her son Liam Butcher (James Forde), but is shocked to find them on a date. Bianca is angry and wants Carol to end the relationship, because Steve could see something and report to Bianca's new probation officer. Carol tells Bianca that she has ended her relationship with Steve but he approaches Bianca in the market and she realises that Carol lied. Carol tells her friend Masood Ahmed (Nitin Ganatra), who tells Steve about Carol's difficult position. Steve assumes Carol has sent Masood to tell him their relationship is over and is angry with her.

Kate White from Inside Soap wrote on Steve's storyline: "Carol certainly can't be blamed for taking a liking to Steve. Not only is he a nice, eligible fella who's clearly interested in her, but they share a deep bond through having both experienced the agony of losing a child."

Kane, Little Chris, Renzo, Ali and Tayo

Kane (Harry Rafferty), Little Chris (Rizwan Shebani), Renzo (Chase Willoughby), Ali (Leanne Dunstan) and Tayo (Youssef Berouain) are members of a gang, of which Kane is the leader. The gang make their first appearance in the soap on 8 March 2013, and the storyline is the focus of a six-minute episode broadcast during Red Nose Day 2013 on 15 March. The gang's last appearance as a whole is on 29 March, but Kane appears again on 25 and 26 April.
In the episode broadcast on 29 March 2013, a character refers to Kane as "Delton Kane".

The gang first appear running from the tube station, having evaded their fare. They are chased by a ticket inspector, and Liam Butcher (James Forde), who already knows them, helps them to hide. They later meet Liam and invite him to join, giving him cash and saying he will make more money than at his job. They later create a mess in the market, and market inspector Tamwar Masood (Himesh Patel) stands up to them, so they leave. They later mug him, taking his money belt, and Kane goes to Liam's house, giving him some money and thanking him for letting them know about Tamwar's money belt. Liam's mother Bianca Butcher (Patsy Palmer) finds the money belt in Liam's bedroom and is then told that Liam has been associating with a gang. Kat Moon (Jessie Wallace) tells Bianca that the police think the mugging was done by a known gang from an estate where a shooting took place recently. Bianca goes there when Liam does not come home, and sees him messing around with the gang. She confronts them, saying they bullied Liam into joining the gang and she knows about the mugging. She tells Liam to come home, saying he could end up dead. Renzo states that Liam is having dinner with him and his mother that night, but Bianca refuses to believe it. Kane threatens Bianca, eventually pushing her to the ground, which displeases Renzo, who checks if Bianca is okay. Some of the other gang members then take Liam away, while Renzo calmly warns Bianca about the area before disappearing. Liam comes home the next day and the gang arrive later on. Bianca finds them, and tries to make them stay away, while Liam has to be physically restrained by Ray Dixon (Chucky Venn) and locked in his bedroom to stop him seeing the gang. After he is let out, he returns to the gang, and they tell him to prove his loyalty to them, by walking a dangerous wall, smashing a car window, stealing alcohol and stealing money from his colleague Shirley Carter (Linda Henry). The gang then congratulate Liam for passing, by holding a party in his honour. Liam tries to leave the party after being warned off by a girl he knows, but the gang stop him leaving so he hides in the bathroom. As Kane confronts Liam, the police arrive and the entire gang, including Liam, are arrested. They are all released without charge, but the gang blame Liam. When Bianca arrives and sees them all together, Little Chris stabs Liam and they run away. Ava and Dexter then discover the gang have trashed their flat. The gang members are arrested again but as they deny any involvement in the stabbing, they are released on bail.

Liam receives death threats from the gang via text message. Liam's younger sister Tiffany Butcher (Maisie Smith) receives an MP3 player from Ali, so Liam tells Bianca and shows her the text message. Tiffany identifies Ali to the police, who then start to patrol the streets outside the school and the Butchers' home. The next day, a brick is thrown through the kitchen window. Liam decides to stay at home while everyone else is out, locking all the doors and unplugging the phone, but then finds Kane sitting at the kitchen table. Kane tells Liam that he can rejoin the gang if he will go to the police and withdraw his statement. Liam agrees until Kane threatens Tiffany, and Liam runs to escape. He unlocks the door but Kane grabs him. Bianca then arrives and attacks Kane, and Kane is arrested.

Development
It was reported on 4 February 2013 that EastEnders was working with the charity Comic Relief on a storyline "to highlight the growing problem of teen involvement in gangs" and that Liam Butcher (James Forde) would become involved with the gang, leaving his mother Bianca frantic with worry. It is the second time the soap has worked with the charity, following 2011's storyline of Whitney Dean's (Shona McGarty) sexual exploitation. EastEnders executive producer said, "We are delighted to be working with Comic Relief once again. This subject matter is something which is touching the lives of so many young people in London and other cities around the UK. We have taken the opportunity to see the impact from a mother's perspective, and Patsy Palmer gives a powerful performance of a mother doing all she can to protect her son. The telling of this story has also given us the chance to explore the reasons behind the attraction of gangs for teenagers." Additionally, Judith McNeill of Comic Relief said the storyline should be equally important as Whitney's in helping people to understand why young people are vulnerable to becoming involved in gangs.

Norman Pike

Norman Pike, played by Timothy Bentinck, is a solicitor who appears in two episodes on 23 and 29 April 2013, and again on 11 June. Michael Moon (Steve John Shepherd) asks Norman for advice when his estranged wife Janine Butcher (Charlie Brooks) returns and says she wants full custody of their daughter Scarlett Moon and wants to divorce her. Norman advises mediation as a court case could be expensive and emotionally draining. He then attends a meeting between Michael and Janine, with Simone Turnbell (Kate Loustau) as Janine's solicitor. When Janine denies Michael access to Scarlett and takes her away from Walford, Michael goes to the police, who advise him to speak to his solicitor. Michael angrily telephones Norman, and when they meet, Norman tells Michael he can apply for a court order, but Scarlett has not been abducted because they have not left the country.

Bentinck posted on Twitter that he was filming his first scenes on 28 February 2013. After his scenes aired, a Manchester solicitor received an increase in calls requesting information about mediation, and welcomed the storyline, saying, "I watched the episode of EastEnders when it aired on Tuesday and was really pleased to see that such a high profile show was featuring [mediation]. When couples come to divorce, being offered mediation as an option can make a huge difference to their short and long-term future, especially if children are concerned, as in this storyline. We have seen numerous calls on Wednesday asking about mediation, which can only be a positive thing, especially in the light of the recent cuts to legal aid."

Josef

Josef, played by Aleksandar Mikic, appears in three episodes from 6 to 9 May 2013. Josef is a builder hired by Ian Beale (Adam Woodyatt) to work on a restaurant that Ian plans to open. Ian is annoyed that Josef hangs a sign up badly, and when Josef falls and cuts him arm, Ian tells him to go to the hospital and return tomorrow, saying he will not be paid for the rest of the day. Josef instead goes to The Queen Victoria public house, where he speaks to Roxy Mitchell (Rita Simons) about his family. Ian sees Josef and tells him he will get a written warning the next day. The next day, Ian sacks Josef because he is on a break instead of getting cement. Josef gets drunk at the pub and when Roxy leaves the till open, Kat Moon (Jessie Wallace) stops him from taking money and Roxy bars him. Kat later sees Josef enter the pub, and Roxy is shocked to see Josef upstairs. He wants cash from the safe, which Roxy closes. Kat arrives and Josef grabs Roxy. Kat tells Josef he is not thinking straight because he is drunk, and he would not be invited to his daughter's wedding if she found out. Roxy's daughter Amy Mitchell (Amelie Conway) comes in, and Josef lets Roxy go and apologises before leaving.

Heat called Josef "shifty" and said he is the one person in Walford they would not "want barging into [their] lounge uninvited".

Sam James

Sam James, played by Cornell S John, is the former husband of Ava Hartman (Clare Perkins) and estranged father of her son Dexter Hartman (Khali Best). He made his first appearance on 14 May 2013. He departed on 16 December 2013.

Sam visits Ava unexpectedly when she is expecting Billy Mitchell (Perry Fenwick), with whom she has a date. Ava is shocked to see Sam and he asks if a voice he hears is his son, Dexter. Ava tells Sam to wait outside while she sends Dexter out, then invites Sam in. He explains his father, who abandoned him as a child, has died and he wants to reunite with Dexter, who he abandoned when he was three months old. Ava is angry but Sam blames her, saying she was not intimate with him after Dexter was born. Dexter comes back and Sam introduces himself as Jacob, an old friend of Ava's. Dexter likes "Jacob", thinking he is better suited to Ava than Billy. When Sam leaves, Ava tells him to never return. Sam stays overnight at the local bed and breakfast where proprietor Kim Fox (Tameka Empson) takes a liking to him. Sam helps Ian Beale (Adam Woodyatt) with a plumbing problem at his new restaurant and Dexter invites Sam to go for a drink with him. Sam is about to leave, when Ava arrives and angrily tells Sam to leave. Ava's mother Cora Cross (Ann Mitchell) calls Sam by his real name and Dexter realises that he is his father, and is angry at Ava for lying to him. Ava and Dexter continue to reject Sam, until eventually Ava realises she is still in love with Sam and they have sex. Dexter is angry to discover this and tells his mother to choose between them. She chooses Dexter and Sam prepares to leave, but when Dexter sees Ava crying, he reluctantly allows Sam to stay. It emerges that Sam requires a kidney transplant. Ava hopes to donate one of hers but is not a match. Dexter decides to take a test to see if he is a match but Ava refuses to let him. He does so anyway and he is a match, but Sam refuses to let him donate. Dexter persuades his father to accept his kidney and they go through the transplant operation. Ava fusses over both of them while they are recovering, and while Dexter is used to Ava's overprotective nature, Sam feels smothered and considers leaving. On Dexter's birthday, Sam invites Dexter's nurse, Laura (Nathalie Buscombe), who tells Ava how long Sam was waiting for a kidney. Ava then finds a letter confirming that Sam has been on a waiting list since before he returned. Ava confronts Sam, realising that he only returned for Dexter's kidney and tells him to leave. He does but tells Dexter that he is coming back after the weekend. Ava tells him he is not returning but refuses to tell him the truth. This begins to anger Dexter and cause him to insult Ava constantly. Eventually Dexter manages to locate Sam and tells him that he wants to live with him and start afresh. Sam tries to persuade Dexter to go back to Walford and live with Ava but Dexter refuses due to Ava not telling him the truth about the real reason on Sam's departure. Sam assures Dexter that Ava did nothing wrong and confesses that he only came to Walford for a kidney transplant due to failing health and Ava found out when she discovered Sam's letter from a hospital. Once Dexter learns the truth about Sam and realising why Ava evicted Sam from her house, he punches Sam and tells him he does not deserve Ava. As he leaves, Sam attempts to apologise but Dexter tells Sam that he is no father to him and mentions he never wants to see Sam again. This leaves Sam heartbroken and Dexter scowls at him for the last time before leaving him to go back home to Ava.

Development and reception
The character and John's casting were announced by Susan Hill from the Daily Star on 14 April 2013. Hill stated that Sam's arrival is an attempt made by producers to "shake up" the show. She revealed how Sam once walked out on his wife Ava and their infant son Dexter: he went to buy some milk and did not return. Sam decides to seek out his family following his father's death. He is an unwelcome arrival as Ava and Dexter direct their anger towards him. Sam is described as a "master manipulator and charmer". EastEnders producer Lorraine Newman said: "We are delighted to have Cornell join the cast. His powerful presence and natural gravitas will ensure he's a strong presence. The addition of Sam gives us a solid family unit." In September 2013 it was announced that Sam would be leaving at the end of his storyline.

Victoria Garo-Falides, writing for the Daily Mirror, said of Sam's kidney transplant storyline: "Sam's got a bad case of PMT and it's all because his kidney's kaput and he needs a new one. Ava's not a match, but would you Adam and Ava it? Dexter's only gone and got the one he needs. Cue lots of shouty, budget-Morgan-Freeman-style acting from Sam and Ava about butchering their son. But bearing in mind we've warmed to Sam as much as we have a bout of haemorrhoids, does anyone actually care what happens to him or the family? Not so much."

Albert

Albert, played by Huw Parmenter, appears on 18 June. He is a French curate who arrives in Walford with Reverend Stevens (Michael Keating). Dot Cotton (June Brown) asks her step-granddaughter Abi Branning (Lorna Fitzgerald) to show Albert around. Gary Gillatt from Inside Soap wrote of Albert: "We were entirely mystified as to the purpose of Albert (pronounced "Al-bear") the French curate in Walford this week. "Ze poverty! Ze vermin! Ze underworld!" he enthused to Abi—so he's clearly a fan of EastEnders. But what was he for?"

Carl White

Carl White, played by Daniel Coonan, is the ex-boyfriend of Kirsty Branning (Kierston Wareing). He made his first appearance on 20 June 2013. The character was axed in September 2013, and he made his last appearance on 1 January 2014, when he was murdered by Ronnie Mitchell (Samantha Womack).

The character and Coonan's casting were announced on 6 May 2013, when it was revealed that Carl has been in prison, where he had previously shared a cell with Derek Branning (Jamie Foreman). Coonan said of his casting: "EastEnders has been a part of my life since I was 12 years old. I even remember talking about the storylines in school playgrounds in Tottenham and I am very happy and proud to now be a small part of its life." Executive producer Lorraine Newman said: "It's wonderful to have Daniel Coonan joining us in Walford to play Carl White." This is Coonan's second role in EastEnders, as he played David Priors in 2011.

Betty Spragg

Betty Spragg, played by Tessa Wyatt, first appeared on 5 July 2013. Having previously been asked by Patrick Trueman (Rudolph Walker) to be his dance partner, Cora Cross (Ann Mitchell) arrives at his house to discover she is too late as Patrick has found Betty to be his dance partner. Betty further infuriates Cora by baking cakes for Patrick and giving him attention. Cora calls Betty "ridiculous" behind her back. When Patrick and Betty dance together again, he realises he would prefer someone more exciting, but is unable to let Betty down, agreeing to dance again the next day. However Patrick soon ends his friendship with Betty, and resumes his relationship with Cora.

Wyatt's casting was announced on 13 June 2013, when it was revealed that Betty is a dance partner and companion of Patrick who will reportedly clash with Cora, forcing Patrick to choose between the two women. Betty, a Women's Institute member, is a guest character, but Wyatt said she would not turn down the opportunity to extend the role.

Ollie Walters

Ollie Walters, played by Tony O'Callaghan, is a recurring character who appears in four separate stints, from 11 July to 17 September 2013, 7 August 2014, 6 and 7 July, 17 and 18 December 2015, 19 to 21 January 2016, and finally on 14 April 2016. On 10 June 2018, it was announced that Ollie would return later in the year. He made an appearance in two episodes broadcast on 29 June.

Ollie first appears at the local allotments and overhears Jean Slater (Gillian Wright) talking about what vegetables she hopes to grow. He introduces himself to her and gives her advice, saying he will keep an eye on her. The next time they meet, he upsets her because she is overwhelmed by his constant talking. He apologises via a note on a fork. They meet again at a speed dating event, and she agrees to see him again. They go on a date but she worries when he says he is a police officer, because she has broken the law. He says he does not care about that and they kiss. Later, she worries he will be put off by the fact she has bipolar disorder, so does not tell him. She does tell him eventually because he thinks she is acting strangely, but she walks away before he can speak. He researches the condition and tells Jean he wants to continue to see her. However, when she cleans instead of getting ready to go out, he says they can go out another night and she thinks he is scared of her bipolar and thinks their relationship is over.

He returns a few days later and tells Jean's in-law Kat Slater (Jessie Wallace) that he made a mistake, but she warns him to stay away. When Jean's friend Shirley Carter (Linda Henry) prepares to leave, she urges Jean to make up with Ollie. Jean discovers that Ollie has given up his patch at the allotments. She discovers he is retiring to Brighton but is having a party first, so she decides to go, but leaves without seeing Ollie when his friend Frank (Patrick Driver) makes fun of mental illness. The next day, she misses Ollie and is surprised when he arrives to say goodbye. He admits that he loves her and she agrees to come to Brighton with him, but Kat convinces Jean to stay. However, when Kat realises that Jean loves Ollie, she enlists Alfie Moon's (Shane Richie) help to find him, but they fear they are too late. Ollie finds Jean at the allotments, saying he has cancelled his move so he can stay with her, but she says he cannot stay just for her. They declare their love for one another, and leave for Brighton together with Kat's blessing.

When Jean's daughter Stacey Slater (Lacey Turner), confesses to killing Archie Mitchell (Larry Lamb), and is sentenced to five years in prison, her daughter Lily Slater (Aine Garvey) goes to live with Jean and Ollie. Five months later, Jean and Lily arrive at Kat and Alfie's house, and Jean says she and Ollie have split up. Jean attempts suicide, after which Ollie visits her in hospital and says they have not split up and is upset that Jean did not talk to him about her problems. One year later, Jean returns to Walford and reveals to Stacey that Ollie has proposed to her and that they are getting married. Ollie arrives in Walford the next day, but Jean is upset so Ollie immediately takes her back to Brighton. Ollie and Jean then get married.

When Jean and Ollie visit Walford in December, Stacey tells Jean she is being followed. Ollie reveals someone visited Jean back in Brighton and when Stacey asks Jean who he is, only then it emerges that Stacey's father, Brian, secretly had another family, and Stacey discovers the man following her is actually her half brother Kyle Slater (Riley Carter Millington). Ollie is shocked as to why Jean did not tell him, and Jean says that she wanted to forget it and to start afresh. Jean and Ollie return later to meet Stacey's newborn son Arthur Fowler. Stacey is hospitalised after suffering with postpartum psychosis so Jean and Ollie stay in a hotel nearby in case Stacey needs them. They then return to Brighton.

In December 2017, Stacey leaves Walford with her children to stay with Jean and Ollie for a few weeks, after admitting to cheating on Martin with Max Branning (Jake Wood). When Jean returns to Walford in March 2018, Kat asks why Jean is avoiding returning home. Jean admits that Ollie has hurt her. Kat and Stacey invite Ollie to Walford but he denies hitting her. Jean says that Ollie kissed a woman, Elsie, which is why she left, but she still loves Ollie and wants to go home with him, however, Ollie accidentally calls her by Elsie's name so she realises he has been having an affair. Jean then asks Ollie to leave after returning her wedding ring, and she later files for a divorce.

The character and O'Callaghan's casting were announced on 13 June 2013, when it was revealed that Ollie is a gardening enthusiast and a love interest for Jean after she gets her own allotment. O'Callaghan said of his casting, "I am very excited to be joining a show with as much prestige as EastEnders and I'm looking forward to portraying the nice side and humour of Ollie." Since leaving the series in September 2013, O'Callaghan and Wright have returned to the show for three guest stints. Jean returned in August 2014, with Ollie appearing once on 7 August. She returned again in July 2015 when Jean and Ollie married. This saw Ollie appear on 6 and 7 July 2015. Jean returned to the show in December 2015, with Ollie appearing on 17 and 18 December.  Jean returned again in March 2018 and on 10 June 2018 it was confirmed that O'Callaghan would reprise the role once again for a "brief return".

Nora White

Nora White, played Lynn Farleigh, is the mother of Carl (Daniel Coonan) and Adam White (Ben Wigzell). She appears on 23 July 2013, when Carl and his ex-girlfriend Kirsty Branning (Kierston Wareing) decide to visit her in her nursing home for her birthday. Nora does not know they have split up, and she says she is pleased they are still together. While Carl gets some tea, Nora tells Kirsty she hopes for a grandchild from them, but while Kirsty gets a vase for her flowers, Nora takes Carl's hand and digs her nails in, threatening to kill him if he hurts Kirsty, comparing him to his "pathetic" father. Carl and Kirsty leave, and Kirsty can tell Carl is troubled, but does not see the cuts on his hand.

Nora returns to Walford in March 2014. Carl has not been in contact with her for over three months. A meeting with Roxy Mitchell (Rita Simons), Carl's girlfriend, is arranged but Roxy's sister Ronnie (Samantha Womack) tricks her into believing that she is Roxy. Carl's brother, Adam (Ben Wigzell) joins her in Walford, and shows her a picture of Roxy, making Nora realise that she had been lied to. Adam kidnaps Lexi Pearce, which Nora is unhappy about. They arrange to meet Ronnie, who brings Lexi's grandfather Phil Mitchell (Steve McFadden) as back up. Nora demands to know what happened to Carl in return for Lexi but Phil manages to convince Adam to give Lexi back to them. Nora begs the Mitchells for answers causing Ronnie to break down and admit that she killed him, leaving a distraught Nora and Adam shocked. Ronnie later has Adam beaten up by Aleks Shirovs (Kristian Kiehling) and she and Phil visit Adam in hospital whilst Nora sits by his bedside. Ronnie warns the Whites to leave them alone, threatening them with more violence if they do not. She and Phil then leave. Nora has not been seen since.

Inside Soap called Nora "pure, unbridled evil", saying she may be the reason Carl is such a menace. They explained that there is tension between Carl and Nora, and Nora is charming to Carl's ex-girlfriend Kirsty Branning (Kierston Wareing) but when Kirsty is out of the room, "Nora shows her true colours", digging her fingernails into Carl's hand while urging Carl not to lose Kirsty, unaware they are no longer a couple. The magazine compared this behaviour to Carl's burning Ian Beale's (Adam Woodyatt) hand, speculating that he "learnt everything from his evil mum". David Brown from Radio Times suggested bringing Nora back, saying she "was ten times more intimidating [than Carl] and she was only in one episode. [...] Get Carl and his old ma to join forces—then we'd be getting somewhere." Coonan said that Nora is "dominating and horrible" and shows that Carl has "demons within his own family" and a "troubled background". Nora reappeared on 10 March 2014, along with Adam to find the truth about Carl's death.

Sadie Young

Sadie Young, played by Kate Magowan, made her first appearance on 5 August 2013. She is the new owner of the beauty salon. She asks Ian Beale (Adam Woodyatt) for food samples, which she hands out to customers, but refuses to place an order from him for the salon opening. However, she offers Ian the job after his partner Denise Fox (Diane Parish) confronts her. She re-employs Poppy Meadow (Rachel Bright) and Lola Pearce (Danielle Harold) in the salon, and on their opening night, offers a bonus to whoever sells the most, offering customers a discount of 25%. Poppy tells Lola the wrong discount, but tells Sadie she said the correct discount, so Poppy receives the bonus. When Poppy admits the truth, she leaves the job, but later apologises, saying she wants to be like Sadie, and returns the bonus money, so Sadie offers her job back. She gives Lauren Branning (Jacqueline Jossa) a job at the salon when her father Max (Jake Wood) agrees to pay her wages in secret. She is forced to let Lauren go when Max is arrested and sent to prison. She clashes with Kim Fox (Tameka Empson) when rubbish bags start building up in the Square, and leads a group of residents to get the council to increase their rubbish collections. Sadie finally moves to her new home on Albert Square, and it is revealed that she is married to Jake Stone (Jamie Lomas). Sadie and Jake had been separated due to Jake's alcoholism, but they have decided to give their marriage a second chance. Sadie and Jake move to Albert Square, but on their first night it is revealed that years before they accidentally hit a girl with their car and killed her while they were arguing. Lauren and Jake resume their affair behind Sadie's back. Sadie learns of the affair and she leaves with their daughter Bella (Isobelle Molloy), returning briefly the following day to close the salon.

Sadie is a "glamorous" businesswoman. The character and Magowan's casting were announced on 12 July 2013, when it was said that Sadie is "bound to bring some class to Albert Square". It was said that the character would be "shrouded in mystery" initially. Magowan said of her casting, "I'm thrilled to be joining EastEnders and look forward to seeing what the character of Sadie will get up to in Walford." Executive producer Lorraine Newman said, "We're delighted to have the stunning Kate Magowan joining the show. Sadie will sprinkle a little glamour over Walford and—with her no-nonsense approach to life—she's a great role model to those around her. She knows what she wants and will aim high. Sadie plays as hard as she works, creating friendships and admirers in her wake. As the autumn unfolds, we'll soon realise that there is far more to Sadie than simply meets the eye." Magowan was only brought in for the storyline with Lauren and Jake, and it was confirmed in October 2013 that she would leave the show permanently . Magowan filmed her final scenes on 12 December 2013.

Inside Soap said Sadie was a "welcome addition" to the cast, calling her a "breath of fresh air", "smart", "sexy", "mysterious" and "intriguing".

Jake Stone

Jake Stone is played by Jamie Lomas and made his first appearance on 15 August 2013, when he meets Lauren Branning (Jacqueline Jossa) who is attending counselling for alcoholism for the first time. She notices his wedding ring. He is angered when she laughs in a group therapy session. Afterwards he tells her that he was a chef and ran two restaurants in Manchester before alcohol ruined his career and marriage, though he and his wife are trying to mend their relationship. The next time they meet, Jake says he has split from his wife, Sadie Young (Kate Magowan). Lauren starts leaning on Jake for support, because he understands her addiction when her family and friends do not. Jake and Lauren have an affair. Whilst arguing with Sadie, it is revealed that years before he and Sadie accidentally hit a girl with their car and killed her while they were arguing many years before. Jake gets a job at Ian Beale's (Adam Woodyatt) restaurant, Scarlett's, and continues his affair with Lauren behind Sadie's back. When Sadie discovers their affair, she leaves Walford with Bella. Unknown to Jane Beale (Laurie Brett), Jake is later discovered by her in their restaurant. Ian invites him to sleep on his sofa, and asks Alfie Moon (Shane Richie) if he would give Jake a job at his burger van. Alfie agrees, and Jake and Aleks Shirovs (Kristian Kiehling) rent a flat.

The burger van is later taken away, leaving Jake unemployed again. He seeks employment at the café, and also designs Lucy Beale (Hetti Bywater) a website for her new business, causing slight upset with her partner, Lauren. It is hinted that both Jake and Lucy are having a fling as both of them are seen constantly checking their phone and having occasional small talk. It is also implied when Lucy is in a rush to meet her mystery man for a date and Jake was preparing a meal whilst looking out his window, but this is disproved when it is revealed, in a conversation with Aleks, that he has actually been getting in contact with Sadie who refused to attend his meal last minute, as she has not forgiven him. He now works in Ian and Jane's new restaurant, where he sees Lee Carter (Danny-Boy Hatchard) and Lucy having a heart to heart moment. Jake is constantly seen watching both Lucy and Lauren around the square when they pass him, causing Aleks to jokingly taunt him claiming Jake has an obsession with them. Lucy is later killed in mysterious circumstances and when Lauren investigates her death, she discovers the police have already questioned Jake. It is revealed that Jake, under a different guise, sent an email to LB Lettings asking to meet Lauren, which was later read by Lucy. Lucy met with an intoxicated Jake on Walford Common, with Jake claiming that she sent him home in a taxi and he did not see her again. Lauren does not believe his claims, however, and thinks that he killed Lucy. He tries to convince her he is telling the truth but becomes forceful with her. After their confrontation, Lauren visits the police. Jake is later arrested after Lucy's blood and one of her earrings is found in his flat.

Jake is remanded in custody, and a date set for his trial. However, three months later, he is released on bail after new evidence emerges. Jake returns to Tina and Tosh's apartment where Lauren visits him and apologises for accusing of him of murder. He tells her he is leaving for good, so he can be a father to Bella. In February 2015, he returns in a flashback episode of the night Lucy died to rule him out as her murderer.

He is described as "sexy, charming and seductive", and is a recovering alcoholic who is unable to resist temptation. He is good looking and charming, but keeps his secrets to himself. The character and casting were announced on 20 June 2013. Lomas said, "I'm over the moon to be joining the cast of EastEnders. I have admired the show for many years and I can't wait to start working with such a strong cast of actors. Jake Stone is a great character to play and I'm really looking forward to getting my teeth stuck into the role." Executive producer Lorraine Newman said, "We're delighted to welcome Jamie to the world of Walford. I have no doubt he'll make a big impact on screen as Jake Stone. The show's about to enter a really exciting period which Jamie will be a huge part of, with a great storyline allowing him to truly shine." Lomas started filming for his role in June 2013. In March 2014, it was announced Jake was axed and would leave at the end of Lomas's contract in July 2014.

Naomi

Naomi is played by Lisa Maxwell and appears as the girlfriend of David Wicks (Michael French) in one episode on 27 September 2013. Naomi appears at Carol Jackson's (Lindsey Coulson) door because she has been waiting outside for David. It emerges that Naomi is cheating on her husband Don (Simon Thorp) with David and they have stolen his money and are planning to go away to Spain. David and Naomi talk in Carol's kitchen, where she discovers that David has taken £20,000 of the money to give to his daughter Bianca (Patsy Palmer). Naomi dislikes this and the pair argue, with David saying they are just using each other. When David goes upstairs to speak to Carol, Naomi calls Don, who then arrives. Naomi gives Don back his money and tells him that David still has some of it. Don's associates, Leo (Andy Pilgrim) and Mick (James Cox), punch David and take the money. David follows as they leave the house and begs for the money, so they beat him as Carol watches on, and leave.

Maxwell's appearance in the show was announced on 2 August 2013, when a statement said, "Viewers won't be surprised to see the lothario with a woman in tow, however things aren't quite what they seem when the past quickly catches up with them." Maxwell said of her casting, "I've had a fantastic time filming at EastEnders and working with the wonderful Michael [French], Lindsey [Coulson] and Nitin [Ganatra, Masood Ahmed] has been an absolute joy. I can honestly say it's one of the happiest jobs I've done. Michael French is an amazing actor and to be part of such an iconic character's return to the Square felt very special." Maxwell revealed in an interview with Radio Times that she filmed her scenes over a period of "about a week", but she lost her voice on her first day of rehearsals, and said by the time she started filming, "I barely had any voice. I don't know if anybody could tell, but I knew, because I had to breathe properly and make sure that my voice was there. It was a concern for me at one point!" She called the character "fun", and explained Naomi's story: "David Wicks has been in Spain, where Naomi lives with her husband, Don. David and Don are what you would loosely term 'business associates'. Her husband's a bit dodgy and he probably had a few bad goings on in the past. Naomi and Don are back and forth between Spain and Essex, having businesses in both places. But David and Naomi are having an affair and they've decided to nick Don's money and do a runner. But on the way he decides he wants to stop off and see Bianca and bung her a few quid, which is how they find themselves in Albert Square." She explained that she thinks Naomi does love David, but called her "quite a manipulative character", adding that "She's tough, she likes the nice things in life and I imagine that she couldn't be happy without money! And in that sense she's been thoroughly spoilt by Don. So I think she does love David, but only the condition that he's got a few quid. As long as David can provide for her then I think she'd stay with him." Maxwell went on to say that Naomi could return to the series, saying, "She's in love with David Wicks and they've been having an affair for quite some time, from what I gather, so there's unfinished business there. [...] If the experience working on EastEnders is anything like the one I had doing that episode, then in a heartbeat I'd go back."

Terry Spraggan

Terry Spraggan is played by comedian Terry Alderton. His first appearance is in episode 4741, first broadcast on 5 November 2013. In April 2014, it was announced that Terry would be leaving the series. He departs in episode 4924, first broadcast on 12 September 2014, although he makes a guest appearance in episode 5080, first broadcast on 5 June 2015.

Terry arrives with Bianca Butcher (Patsy Palmer), who has returned from Manchester, and meets Bianca's parents Carol Jackson (Lindsey Coulson) and David Wicks (Michael French). Bianca then announces that Terry is moving in, along with his children, TJ (George Sargeant) and Rosie (Jerzey Swingler), because his landlord has forced him to move out. Bianca's family struggle to accept Terry, as they know nothing about him. Terry's air hostess ex-wife Nikki Spraggan (Rachel Wilde) visits Terry and his new family with presents for TJ and Rosie. This makes Bianca's children jealous, and Bianca clashes with Nikki as a result. She visits again at Christmas, but over Christmas Dinner she clashes with Bianca when she accidentally spills gravy down her front and Bianca perceives this as being deliberate. She throws Terry and his family out as a result, and, although they reunite, he decides to rent his own place, around the corner, to live in with TJ and Rosie.

Bianca helps Terry accept circumstances when Cindy becomes pregnant and reveals TJ is the father, and he clashes with Cindy's guardian, Ian Beale (Adam Woodyatt). Carol develops cancer, and it is revealed she has a cancer susceptibility mutation in her BRCA2 gene, meaning that there is a 50% chance of Bianca having the gene and being extremely likely to develop breast cancer like her mother. As a result, Bianca struggles to cope and pushes Terry away. Terry steps up to support Bianca's adopted daughter, Whitney Dean (Shona McGarty), but, in her upset state, Bianca accuses Terry of molesting her, like her ex-partner Tony King (Chris Coghill). As a result, Bianca and Terry split up.

Terry supports his friend Alfie Moon (Shane Richie) through his wife Kat's (Jessie Wallace) pregnancy. He attracts the attention of new market trader Donna Yates (Lisa Hammond), but it is clear his interests still lie with Bianca. It is later revealed that Terry and Bianca have secretly been seeing each other for two months, not telling anyone for fear of complicating things. Terry wants to tell the truth, but Bianca remains firm about keeping it a secret. TJ tells Bianca that they are moving to Milton Keynes, and she is angry with Terry as he did not tell her. He tells her he needs to move on as she obviously does not have the same feelings as he does. However, Bianca proves her commitment by telling Terry she loves him and agreeing to move to Milton Keynes with him. They take Bianca's children to see the house, and they agree to give living in Milton Keynes a go. Nine months later, Terry appears to collect his granddaughter, Beth Williams, from Ian and Jane Beale (Laurie Brett).

Development
The character and Alderton's casting were announced on 23 August 2013, when it was announced he would be Bianca's new boyfriend, after meeting her off-screen in Manchester. Terry is a cab driver, described as a "typical Cockney" and a "bloke's bloke", who is "never short of an entertaining story to tell about who he's had in his cab the night before".

It was announced that Terry would leave the soap later in 2014, as part of Bianca's exit storyline, and it was later confirmed that his children, TJ and Rosie, would leaving alongside him. Alderton filmed his final scenes on 18 July 2014.

TJ Spraggan

TJ Spraggan, played by George Sargeant, is Terry Spraggan's (Terry Alderton) son. He makes his first appearance on 5 November 2013, and departed on 12 September 2014 after appearing in 28 episodes. Sargeant reprised the role in 2018 and the character appeared on 18 and 19 January.

TJ first appears with his sister, Rosie Spraggan (Jerzey Swingler), arriving together when their father moves to Albert Square with his new girlfriend Bianca Butcher (Patsy Palmer). TJ asks questions about a crime scene at the house next door, scaring Rosie when he tells her it was a murder. The two clash with Bianca's children, especially Liam Butcher (James Forde). TJ finds out that Liam was once in a gang, Whitney Dean (Shona McGarty) was sexually exploited and Bianca was imprisoned for assault, and is not happy about living with them, so calls his mother, Nikki Spraggan (Rachel Wilde). She arrives but TJ changes his mind about wanting to go. Eventually, Bianca and Terry agree that Nikki should have Christmas dinner at theirs, because it is what Rosie and TJ want. When a positive pregnancy test is found, TJ meets with Cindy Williams (Mimi Keene) and panics what they should do, revealing that she is pregnant with his child. Cindy initially decides to have a termination so they go to the abortion clinic, but after a disagreement, TJ leaves her there. Cindy later informs that TJ that she did not go through with the abortion and is keeping the baby. After talking to his father, TJ then tells Cindy that he is committed to raising their baby together.

TJ stays with his gran for while until Cindy, who returns from Plymouth suddenly, gives birth to his daughter, Beth. TJ struggles with the prospect of being a father so young, despite Terry's determination for him to face up to his responsibilities. He reveals to Bianca that Terry is planning to move them to Milton Keynes, and that is part of his reasoning for not wanting to get close to Beth; Bianca is initially furious, but later agrees to move there with them after reuniting with Terry. Liam is furious when he hears TJ saying that he wants nothing to do with Beth. Then before Terry and Bianca move to Milton Keynes, Liam takes TJ to see Beth one last time. TJ leaves with Bianca, Morgan Butcher (Devon Higgs), Tiffany Butcher (Maisie Smith), Rosie and Terry but Whitney and Liam stay. Nine months later, Cindy sends Beth to live with TJ and he takes over custody for her.

Over three years after leaving, Tiffany returns to Walford and informs Whitney that Bianca has attempted suicide. When Whitney tries contacting Bianca, TJ tells her that Bianca is on a cruise. TJ and Whitney arrange to meet but TJ fails to provide any answers for Tiffany's behaviour. When Tiffany realises that TJ is in Walford, she disappears; TJ acts casual about her disappearance. When she returns, Tiffany reveals that Bianca and Terry left Tiffany in TJ's care but TJ had sex with random girls in the house and threatened Tiffany so that she would not tell anyone. Whitney orders TJ to leave and keeps Tiffany in her care.

In an interview with Laura-Jayne Tyler of Inside Soap, Alderton explained that TJ struggles to deal with the tension between Terry's children and Bianca's children. On 20 July 2014, it was announced that the Spraggan family would be written out of the series following Palmer's decision to quit. The characters departed on 12 September 2014. On 18 January 2018, Sargeant made an unannounced return to the series for two episodes following Tiffany's reintroduction.

Rosie Spraggan

Rosie Spraggan, played by Jerzey Swingler, is Terry Spraggan's (Terry Alderton) daughter. She first appears on 7 November 2013 with her brother, TJ (George Sargeant), arriving together when their father moves to Albert Square with his new girlfriend Bianca Butcher (Patsy Palmer). TJ asks questions about a crime scene at the house next door, scaring Rosie when he tells her it was a murder. The two clash with Bianca's children, especially Liam Butcher (James Forde). Bianca and Terry agree that Rosie's mother, Nikki Spraggan (Rachel Wilde) should have Christmas dinner at theirs, because it is what Rosie and TJ want.

Alderton told Inside Soap that Rosie is "just as gobby as her dad", explaining that "if there's something to be eaten, she'll eat it—something to play with, she'll play with it." Rosie left alongside Terry and TJ on 12 September 2014.

Tina Carter

Tina Carter, played by Luisa Bradshaw-White, is the sister of Shirley Carter (Linda Henry), aunt of Mick Carter (Danny Dyer) and mother of Zsa Zsa Carter (Emer Kenny). She first appears on 18 November 2013.  
Tina was first mentioned in the 2010 spin-off series EastEnders: E20, in which Zsa Zsa was a main character. The character and Bradshaw-White's casting were announced on 19 September 2013. It was said that Tina is similar to Shirley, and is "loud, brash, cheeky and full of energy". Bradshaw-White said of her casting, "I am so excited to be joining EastEnders to play Tina as she is such a brilliant character to play. Linda is an amazing person to work with and the energy between Shirley and Tina is explosive!" The character was originally going to be "an overweight 50-year-old who's past it", but was changed for Bradshaw-White.

Nikki Spraggan

Nikki Spraggan, played by Rachel Wilde, is Terry Spraggan's (Terry Alderton) ex-wife, and the mother of his children TJ (George Sargeant) and Rosie Spraggan (Jerzey Swingler). She first appears on 2 December 2013. She visits Bianca Butcher's (Patsy Palmer) house after TJ telephones her, and Bianca begrudgingly invites her to lunch. However, Bianca is surprised when they bond, until Nikki reveals that Terry has lived with several women since they divorced. Nikki returns a few weeks later after TJ calls her, unhappy about living at Bianca's house. She insists that her children should live with her but TJ says he is happy to stay. Terry then says the children will stay with him for a family Christmas and Nikki invites herself. She arrives two days before Christmas with presents for TJ and Rosie, and Terry says the children can stay with Nikki for Christmas because she will be alone. On Christmas Day, Bianca tells Nikki that she wants her to let Terry go and she responds by saying that she did that three years before when they had separated. During Christmas dinner, Nikki accidentally spills gravy on Bianca and, believing Nikki did it on purpose, she throws milk over her and a food fight takes place. Bianca asks Terry, Nikki and the children to leave, which they do. However, he makes it clear that he blames her for ruining things with Bianca.

In February, Bianca's father David Wicks (Michael French) invites Nikki to the square to talk to TJ when she learns that he has got Cindy Williams (Mimi Keene) pregnant. After a heart-to-heart with TJ and advice from David, she decides to stay in Walford for her children's sake but continues to interfere in Terry and Bianca's relationship and attempts to seduce David. He initially resists and they are almost caught by Bianca, her half-sister Sonia Fowler (Natalie Cassidy) and her mother Carol Jackson (Lindsey Coulson). Nikki learns that Carol has breast cancer but promises not to say anything. David proposes to Carol and tells Nikki to stay away from him. However, he later responds to her advances and kisses Nikki. She later leaves on a flight for Acapulco but offers David the chance to come with her but he refuses, wanting to stay loyal to Carol. Nikki returns to the Square at Easter. She is heartbroken when she is transferred to the check-in desk at work and confides in David. She attempts to kiss him again when he comforts her but he rebuffs her advances. She even allows him to see her naked but he still rejects her. When Bianca discovers this, she attacks Nikki in the street, pushing her into a pile of rubbish. David does this too when Nikki again tries to tempt him on his and Carol's wedding day so Nikki goes back to work. In July, she returns and tells Terry that she is homeless, and he allows her to stay with him. Terry and Nikki contemplate getting back together, although new market stallholder Donna Yates (Lisa Hammond) is attracted to Terry. Terry and Nikki arrange to meet in The Queen Victoria public house, but Terry does not show up as he is comforting Bianca and tells Nikki that he fell asleep on the sofa. Terry has second thoughts about reconciling with Nikki and when the couple have dinner that evening, Terry tells Nikki how he feels, explaining that whatever feelings they had once had for each other are gone and that they should not settle for each other. When Terry tells Nikki that he knows that she does not love him, she realises that he is right and decides to move out. Nikki packs her bags and after bidding farewell to Terry, she leaves Walford in a taxi to stay with some of her colleagues. It is later revealed that she has returned to work as a stewardess.

Alderton described Nikki, a flight attendant, as "a selfish woman" who "thinks it's okay to pop back when she feels like it and pick up where she left off [with the children]." Inside Soap said that Nikki is "the picture of immaculate grooming" when she arrives, and that she causes friction between Terry and his new girlfriend Bianca Butcher (Patsy Palmer). The magazine also called her "scheming".

Tramp

Tramp is a stray dog found by Abi Branning (Lorna Fitzgerald). He first appears on 3 December 2013. The dog wakes up several Albert Square residents in the night by barking, and in the morning, Abi tells her father Max Branning (Jake Wood) that she will deal with the dog. She immediately takes a liking to him and brings him in the house. Max wants him gone, but Abi says she has named him. Max calls him "Tramp" and when Abi's sister Lauren Branning (Jacqueline Jossa) arrives, she and Abi convince Max to let them keep the dog. He mates with the Carter family's bulldog, Lady Di, who becomes pregnant. Upset over her break-up with Jay Brown (Jamie Borthwick), a drunken Abi tries to leave Albert Square, and when Max refuses to take her she decides to drive herself, but runs over Tramp, killing him.

Tramp is played by a four-year-old rescue dog named Duffie. Duffie's owner, Chris Mancini, from Enfield Town, said: "I am so excited about seeing Duffie on EastEnders and this is the best moment of his career so far. He is in the programme for the foreseeable future and although he has done adverts in the past, this is the biggest job for him." Duffie was signed to Animal Ambassadors, and his breed is unknown. Jossa said of the new addition to the Branning family, "Tramp is really cool and very well trained. He's big, scruffy and fluffy—and so cute!" She explained that in the first scene the Brannings filmed with the dog, Wood had to shout at Tramp and tell him to get out, and Tramp was supposed to stare and not move, but said that "Tramp got up and walked out right away. It was very funny!" Tramp's final appearance is on 19 February 2015 during a flashback episode.

Linda Carter

Linda Carter, played by Kellie Bright, is the partner of Mick Carter (Danny Dyer). She was introduced by executive producer Dominic Treadwell-Collins. Bright's casting was announced on 1 October 2013. From Boxing Day 2013 onwards, they became the new landlord and landlady of The Queen Victoria public house.

Mick and Linda, a former glamour model, have been together since they were children, and she is the love of his life. The BBC said of Linda, "She's the first to admit she wasn't blessed with brains, but her fluffy candyfloss exterior belies an inner steel. A lioness who will fight tooth and nail for her brood, she can be 'more smother than mother'."

Mick Carter

Mick Carter, played by Danny Dyer, is the son of Shirley Carter (Linda Henry), the brother of Dean Wicks (Matt Di Angelo) and the nephew of Tina Carter (Luisa Bradshaw-White). On 1 October 2013, it was announced that Dyer had been cast in the role of Shirley and Tina's younger brother, Mick, along with his partner Linda Carter (Kellie Bright), though it emerged that he is actually Shirley's son. The character became the new landlord of The Queen Victoria public house, appearing from Christmas 2013. Executive producer Dominic Treadwell-Collins, who introduced the characters, said: "I'm so excited to have actors of Danny and Kellie's calibre joining what is an already strong and talented company of actors." Dyer said of his casting, "I am so excited about starting a new chapter in my career and cannot wait to become part of the East End family."

Mick was described by the BBC as someone who loves his wife, his children, his pet dog, the monarchy, and the song "Land of Hope and Glory". He was called "a bloke's bloke" and it was said he would "apparently think nothing of throwing on Linda's pink dressing gown and cooking breakfast for the family." Upon the character's announcement, Treadwell-Collins explained that Mick and Linda had been married for over twenty years, and were moving to Walford from Watford. He called it a "good marriage" and said they have "an easy shorthand with each other—but can also still fight like teenagers." He said that the characters would laugh, cry, argue and make up, which would embarrass their children, but would delight their neighbours. It was said that the couple "still love each other, no matter what life throws at them", and that after moving, "life's about to throw them a few curve balls."

Johnny Carter

Johnny Carter, played by Sam Strike from 2013 to 2014 and Ted Reilly from 2016 to 2018, is the son of Mick Carter (Danny Dyer) and Linda Carter (Kellie Bright).

Johnny makes his first appearance on 26 December 2013, moving into The Queen Victoria public house with his mother and father. He soon meets Whitney Dean (Shona McGarty), and his parents tease him about being attractive to women. However, after Danny Pennant (Gary Lucy) compliments Johnny on his looks, Johnny asks if he meant it, leading to them kissing, which his grandmother Shirley Carter (Linda Henry) witnesses. Johnny lets his parents assume he kissed Whitney, though Shirley advises him against this. When Johnny's sister Nancy Carter (Maddy Hill) arrives in Walford, she reveals Johnny is gay to her family during an argument. Eventually, Johnny breaks down and comes out to Mick after denying his sexuality previously. They are unaware, however, that Linda has overheard their conversation. Linda finds it extremely difficult to come to terms with Johnny's sexuality, which leads to numerous arguments with Mick and Shirley. Johnny eventually reveals his sexuality to Whitney, who is hurt as she feels that Johnny has been using her. She soon forgives Johnny and even offers for him to move in with her and her family if his relationship with Linda does not improve. Johnny later threatens to leave The Vic, so Mick forces Linda to sort things out. Linda seems to have finally come round to the idea of Johnny being gay, but she later breaks down over the situation. Johnny realises that Linda is not fully accepting of his sexuality when she invites Whitney (who she thinks is pregnant) over and tries to set them up, Johnny feels hurt and betrayed and a huge argument ensues. Mick then tells Linda to fully accept his sexuality or risk losing him forever. Whitney tells Johnny that he needs to get a boyfriend so that everyone can accept it and move on with their lives. Johnny manages to secure a job as a barman in Sharon Rickman's (Letitia Dean) new bar. When Sharon is attacked by two masked intruders, Johnny hides upstairs and later phones for help. His family assumes he scared the intruders away but Johnny is forced to admit he hid upstairs and did nothing. Johnny fails some of his exams and Linda interferes by going to see his tutor behind his back. Furious, Johnny rows with his mother, calling her a "stupid bitch", and decides to leave Walford, ashamed of what he said. Johnny's great-grandfather Stan Carter (Timothy West) takes Linda and Nancy to see him at Stan's unoccupied flat. Johnny and Linda apologise and Linda gives him her blessing to attend Pride London, where he meets Gianluca Cavallo (Gabriele Lombardo). He tells his siblings he has met someone, and Lee encourages him to invite Gianluca to Linda's birthday party. Johnny loses his virginity to Gianluca, and after the party, Linda tells Johnny she approves of Gianluca and he is welcome to come back.

Johnny shows brief interest in Ben Mitchell (Harry Reid) when he comes out of prison. Ben has told his father his homosexuality was a phase, but confuses Johnny by flirting with him at times and rejecting him at others. Johnny realises that Ben is desperate to prove himself and criticises him for dating Abi Branning (Lorna Fitzgerald), but Ben continues to deny he is gay. Ben later tries to kiss Johnny, but he rebukes him. Johnny announces that he is going to go travelling with Gianluca. Initially, Linda finds this hard to accept, but she soon relents, and Johnny leaves with her blessing, after telling Ben to stop denying who he is.

Johnny (now played by Ted Reilly) returns amid a family crisis in April 2016. He avoids talking about Gianluca and realises Linda is hiding something from him. During a heart-to-heart talk, he admits he and Gianluca have split up, and Linda tells him she was raped by his uncle Dean Wicks (Matt Di Angelo). Johnny cannot deal with everything that has happened to the family since he left, and tells Mick he blames him for it all. He apologises the next day and persuades Mick to stop blaming Nancy for the accident that has left their brother Ollie Carter with possible brain damage. Johnny decides to not return to Italy and convinces his university tutor to let him take his second year exam. His tutor reluctantly accepts; Johnny takes and passes his exams.

When Ben's boyfriend Paul Coker (Jonny Labey) is murdered in a homophobic attack, Johnny supports Ben and encourages him to tell the police that the crime was motivated by homophobia. Linda worries Johnny is developing feelings for Ben, but he insists he is merely being a good friend. In November Ben, still grieving and feeling rejected by his father, gets drunk and tries to kiss Johnny, but Johnny refuses to take advantage of his vulnerable state.

With Lee due to marry Johnny's close friend Whitney, Johnny discovers Lee has got into debt with a payday loan company. He encourages his brother to come clean, but Lee forces himself to go ahead with the wedding. The Carters then later become victims of a burglary. Johnny attempts to fend off the robbers but is injured in the process, after one of them attacks him with a baseball bat. It is later revealed that Lee was responsible for the burglary and a result Johnny becomes hostile towards him.

After Ben and Jay Brown (Jamie Borthwick) move to their own flat, Johnny attends Ben's their housewarming party, which is also Ben's 21st birthday party. After Abi and Jay both try to set them up, they have a one-night stand after getting drunk. The next day, they both worry that the other wants a relationship but are relieved to realise they just see each other as friends.

Johnny's off-screen life involves his university studies, and in 2017 he completes his law degree and receives a 2:1. Soon after this, he forms a friendship with older gay neighbour Derek Harkinson (Ian Lavender), after Derek berates Johnny for standing idly by during a homophobic incident. Johnny learns that Derek has a criminal conviction due to having a 20 year old boyfriend when the gay age of consent was still 21. Johnny encourages Derek not to leave the Square after his past incarceration is discovered. Following a gas explosion in the Square, Johnny tries to check on Ted Murray (Christopher Timothy) and his wife Joyce Murray (Maggie Steed), but Ted accidentally shoots Johnny after believing him to be a burglar, although Joyce later takes the blame. The ambulance that Linda and Johnny are travelling in is hit by a truck and falls over, killing the paramedic attending to him. Jack Branning (Scott Maslen), who is following in the car behind, manages to get into the ambulance and keep Johnny alive via advice from the ambulance driver until a hospital helicopter arrives. Mick and Linda visit Johnny in hospital where he will make a full recovery. After he is discharged, Johnny writes a letter to the judge in Ted and Joyce's defence, which helps to avoid a conviction.

The Carter family are stunned when they discover that they are being evicted from The Queen Vic thanks to Max Branning (Jake Wood). However, they are later offered a chance to keep the pub when they have to pay £150,000 to retain ownership of the pub. In an attempt to raise the cash, Mick joins Aidan Maguire (Patrick Bergin) in a robbery. However, the stolen money goes missing and Mick becomes the prime suspect due to his desperation to save The Queen Vic. Unbeknown to Aidan, the Carters pawn a stolen ring from the robbery and are able to keep The Queen Vic. Johnny is offered a contract with a law firm in Manchester and on the day of his departure, Aidan tries to intimidate him. Johnny lies that the money came from his ancestor's war medals. Using one of Johnny's school history projects, the Carters are able to fool Aidan into thinking that the money is legitimate. Johnny leaves Walford for Manchester in a taxi cab after bidding farewell to Mick and Linda.

Casting
Strike's casting as Johnny was announced on 29 October 2013, on which the actor said: "I'm really excited to be joining EastEnders and the Carter family. They're all really strong characters and I can't wait to see what EastEnders has planned for us all. I've grown up watching Danny [Dyer] and Kellie [Bright], both of whom are lovely, so to be playing their son is kind of surreal." Johnny is described as a 19-year-old "mummy's boy". He is the youngest of three siblings, is a university student and is called "a gentle boy who's happy to let the rest of his family be the centre of attention", though it was said he has a secret that will "place him right at the centre of a family storm". This was the fact that Johnny is gay. On 14 November it was announced that Strike decided to leave the show and made his final appearance on 25 December 2014 via a skype call on Christmas Day.

In February 2016, it was announced that the role of Johnny Carter was being recast and would return later in the year, but that the casting process was still ongoing at that point. Later on, it was announced that Ted Reilly would be taking over the role. Reilly's first episode was broadcast on 11 April 2016. It was announced on 19 December 2017 that Reilly had finished filming with the show and would depart "within the next few weeks". A show spokesperson confirmed the news. Reilly later confirmed that it was his choice to leave the serial and said he would miss his on-screen family. On his departure, the actor commenented, "It was a really tough decision to leave, but at this stage in my career it's very important to keep being challenged & experience new things!" Reilly made his last appearance on 29 January 2018.

Lady Di

Lady Di is the Carters' pet bulldog. A new canine character in EastEnders was first known about when Linda Carter (Kellie Bright) and her husband Mick (Danny Dyer) were announced to be joining the series on 1 October 2013. Lady Di has been billed as the first major animal character in EastEnders since Wellard died in 2008. The Radio Times speculated what breed of dog would be joining the show, but it was finally revealed to be a bulldog when the first promotional photo of the entire Carter family together was released on 29 October. Further details were released on 10 November, when it was said the dog's name would be Lady Di, named after Diana, Princess of Wales, by Linda. It was said that in the show's narrative, Linda named the dog after the Princess because "bulldogs are kind, gentle dogs and love kids". In reality, writer Daran Little came up with the name. Inside Soap said that Lady Di would be "the true queen of the new Vic dynasty", who would "win everybody's hearts from day one". They reported that the dog is "the apple of [...] Mick's eye", and would help show a softer side to Mick's character. A source from EastEnders told the magazine that Lady Di would "make quite an impression" and would be "top dog" in her new home. They added that "Lady Di is at the centre of EastEnders most exciting new arrivals, and she'll be involved in plenty of drama!"

After moving into The Queen Victoria public house with her owners, Linda plans to make money by breeding Lady Di's pedigree. However, Lady Di becomes pregnant after mating with Abi Branning's (Lorna Fitzgerald) dog, Tramp (Duffie), to Linda's annoyance. Lady Di gives birth to five puppies, although the youngest almost does not survive until Phil Mitchell (Steve McFadden) saves her. Lady Di stays with Babe Smith (Annette Badland) until she sells the puppies before returning home a couple of months later. After the birth of Mick and Linda's son, Ollie, Lady Di starts behaving in a way that Mick struggles with, and Lady Di is sent to live with Mick's aunt, Tina Carter (Luisa Bradshaw-White), at Carol Jackson's (Lindsey Coulson) house. Lady Di takes a dislike to Tina's girlfriend, Sonia Fowler (Natalie Cassidy), and is sent to live with Mick's mother, Shirley (Linda Henry), without Mick's permission. When Mick finds out, he furiously takes Lady Di back to The Queen Vic, where she is welcomed by Linda, who has missed her. Mick later uses taking Lady Di for walks as way of meeting Shirley in secret. Lady Di alerts Linda that something is wrong with Ollie following a fall from his highchair and she also alerts them when Ollie is suffering a seizure. Following months of roof leaks, the kitchen ceiling collapses on top of Lady Di, who is in her cage at the time. Though Lady Di is not harmed, tests show that she has pneumonia and her insurance does not cover treatment as it is a pre-existing condition, despite that Carters not knowing about it before. Shirley and Linda sell the freehold of The Queen Vic to pay for Lady Di's operation, which is successful.

Others

References

External links

2013
, EastEnders
EastEnders